Louis Carpenter may refer to:

Louis H. Carpenter (1839–1916), American military general
Louis Carpenter (judge) (1829–1863), American jurist
Louis George Carpenter (1861–1935), college professor and engineer
Lou Carpenter, Neighbours character

See also
Lewis Carpenter (disambiguation)